Newton M. Pitt House is a historic home located at Sandy Creek in Oswego County, New York.  It was built in 1851 and is a two-story, frame Greek Revival style structure with an "L" shaped plan, gable roof, and wide cornice.

It features a prominent pedimented portico supported by two square pillars and two columns with Ionic capitals.

It was listed on the National Register of Historic Places in 1989.

References

Houses on the National Register of Historic Places in New York (state)
Houses completed in 1851
Houses in Oswego County, New York
1851 establishments in New York (state)
National Register of Historic Places in Oswego County, New York